Adrian Pledger (born May 3, 1976) is a former American professional basketball player. Pledger played guard and forward for Ironi Nahariya in the Israeli Basketball Premier League. He was the top scorer in the 2000-01 Israel Basketball Premier League

Biography
Pledger's hometown is Camden, Alabama. He is 6' 3" (1.90 metres) tall.

He first played college basketball at Wallace State Community College in Alabama from 1995-96. In 1996 Pledger was a second-team JUCO all-American after he averaged 25 points, 14 rebounds, 5 steals, and 3 blocks a game. With Wallace State, he was the 1996 Alabama Sports Writers Association Community College Athlete of the Year.

Pledger then played basketball for West Virginia University for the Mountaineers, was a guard and captain of the basketball team in 1997-98, and graduated in 1998. His two-point .560 field goal percentage in 1996-97 was fifth in the Big East Conference. In his two seasons of play, he averaged 13.1 points per game, with a 51.1% field goal percentage. 

Pledger played guard and forward for Ironi Nahariya in the Israeli Basketball Premier League in Israel. He was the top scorer in the 2000-01 Israel Basketball Premier League.

References 

Living people

American men's basketball players
Basketball players from Alabama

West Virginia Mountaineers men's basketball players

1976 births
American expatriate basketball people in Israel
Wallace State Lions men's basketball players
Israeli Basketball Premier League players